The London Borough of Haringey (pronounced  , same as Harringay) is a London borough in North London, classified by some definitions as part of Inner London, and by others as part of Outer London. It was created in 1965 by the amalgamation of three former boroughs. It shares borders with six other London boroughs. Clockwise from the north, they are: Enfield, Waltham Forest, Hackney, Islington, Camden, and Barnet.

Some of the more familiar local landmarks include Alexandra Palace, Bruce Castle, Jacksons Lane, Highpoint I and II, and Tottenham Hotspur Football Club. The borough has extreme contrasts: areas in the west, such as Highgate, Muswell Hill and Crouch End are among the most prosperous in the country; in the east of the borough, some wards are classified as being among the most deprived 10% in the country. Haringey is also a borough of contrasts geographically. The borough includes large areas of green space, which make up more than 25% of its total area.

History

In the Last Glacial Maximum, Haringey was at the edge of a huge glacial mass that reached as far south as Muswell Hill. There is evidence of both Stone Age and Bronze Age activity.

In the Iron Age and Roman periods, Haringey was peopled by a Celtic tribe called the Catuvellauni, whose extensive lands centred on Hertfordshire and Middlesex. The Romans' presence is evidenced chiefly by the roads they built through the area. Tottenham High Road was part of the main Roman thoroughfare of Ermine Street. There have also been Roman finds in the borough which suggests possible Roman settlement.

In the 5th and 6th centuries after the Saxon invasions the settlement of Haeringehaia was founded; its name coming from the Old English haeringe meaning a "meadow of hares".

Haringey remained a rural area until the 18th century when large country houses close to London became increasingly common. The coming of the railways from the mid-nineteenth century onwards led to rapid urbanisation; by the turn of the century much of Haringey had been transformed from a rural to an urbanised environment.

Administration and politics

Administrative history
The borough has its roots in the Ancient Parishes of Tottenham (which covered most of the borough) and Hornsey in the south-west; and adopted the name Haringey which was an alternative name for Hornsey. These two parishes were probably formed by the end of the 12th century and maintained the same boundaries from that point on. Tottenham was part of the Edmonton Hundred, with Hornsey a part of the Ossulstone Hundred, and subsequently the Finsbury Division when Ossulstone was sub-divided. Both parishes were a part of Middlesex.

Wood Green was a chapelry within Tottenham, but population growth led to it becoming a separate ecclesiastical parish in 1866 and an independent civil parish in 1894. Wood Green, Tottenham and Hornsey became Municipal Boroughs in 1900, inheriting the boundaries of the pre-existing parishes, except in that South Hornsey was transferred to the Metropolitan Borough of Stoke Newington.

The borough in its modern form was founded in 1965, from the former Municipal Borough of Hornsey, the Municipal Borough of Wood Green and the Municipal Borough of Tottenham. The new borough became part of the new Greater London Council. However, some legacy of the historic municipal divisions survives to the present day, with the relative prosperity of the different parts of the borough still split broadly along the old boundary lines.

Town Hall

The town hall is Haringey Civic Centre on Wood Green High Road. It was opened in 1958. It is a listed building.

Although much of the building is now unused,  the Civic Centre is the official seat of Haringey Council and contains the council chambers.

Etymology

The names Haringey, Harringay and Hornsey in use today are all different variations of the same Old English: Hæringeshege.  Hæring was a Saxon chief who lived probably in the area around Hornsey. Hæringeshege meant Hæring's enclosure and evolved into Haringey, Harringay and Hornsey.

The Haringey coat of arms and logo

The official heraldic arms were granted on 10 May 1965, after the mergers of the former Municipal Borough of Hornsey, the Municipal Borough of Wood Green and the Municipal Borough of Tottenham. Unlike most other London boroughs, it was decided not to create arms based on the charges in the coats of arms of the former boroughs. The coat of arms contains black and gold, representing stability, a cogwheel for industry and a rising sun for the new borough.

The borough has a simple badge described as "Eight Rays" [as in the arms]. A flag is used which looks like a banner of arms but with the tinctures reversed, so that it has eight black rays on a yellow field. The rays are also a symbol of the world's first regular high-definition television transmissions in 1936 from the mast of Alexandra Palace, one of the landmarks in the Borough of Haringey.

The arms is used in the mayoral regalia of the borough. The mayoral chain has the heraldic achievement hanging in a badge made out of 18 k gold and enamel, with the text "The London Borough of Haringey MCMLXV". The chain has stylized H's and hares sitting within laurel wreaths. The hares represent the name of the borough, since Haringey is believed to mean "a meadow of Hares".

Wards

There are 19 wards in Haringey. Although they bear the names of long-established local areas, many have boundaries which do not exactly match the locally-understood boundaries of those areas.

The wards are:

Alexandra
Bounds Green
Bruce Grove
Crouch End
Fortis Green
Harringay
Highgate
Hornsey
Muswell Hill
Noel Park
Northumberland Park
Seven Sisters
St Anns
Wood Green
Stroud Green
Tottenham Green
Tottenham Hale
West Green
White Hart Lane
Woodside

Politics

Since its creation, Haringey has always been a Labour borough, except during the three years following the Conservative landslide of 1968.

The Conservatives won that election by 53 seats to Labour's 7.

Times, however, have certainly changed, and no Conservative candidate has won a local government seat in Haringey since 1998. In fact the only Conservative presence on the council during this time was the 10 months that former Mayor, Cllr Alan Dobie spent sitting as a Conservative following his defection after being deselected in July 2009.

For several years, Haringey Council was the subject of nationwide criticism over its handling of the welfare of young children, in connection with the murder of Victoria Climbié and the death of Baby P. George Meehan, Council leader at the time of both the Victoria Climbie inquiry and the death of Baby P, resigned after a "damning" examination of Social Services caused by the Baby P case. He and Liz Santry, cabinet member for Children's Services, initially refused to resign at a Full Council meeting. All Labour Councillors voted for them to remain in their posts. Sharon Shoesmith, who was sacked on 8 December 2008 without any compensation package over the Baby P affair, was successful in her case of unfair dismissal and received compensation from the council. Cllr Claire Kober became leader of Haringey Council on 10 December 2008.

In March 2009, the council's overall performance was assessed in an Audit Commission review as among the fourth worst in the whole country, and the worst in London. Its previous three stars were reduced to one.

From a majority of only 3 in 2006, Labour increased their majority to 11 at the May 2010 local elections, winning 34 seats to the Liberal Democrats' 23. In the May 2014 local elections, Labour went on to make significant gains, particularly in the West of the borough, gaining seats as far west as Muswell Hill and Fortis Green.

In the local elections of May 2014 Labour substantially increased its majority up to 39 seats over the Liberal Democrats, ahead by 48 seats to 9. That dominance was extended in August 2016, when former opposition leader, Cllr Sarah Elliott, crossed the floor to join Labour. This was the third time that Haringey Lib Dem Councillors had crossed to Labour, following the defections of councillors Catherine Harris and Ali Demirci late in 2007.  In January 2010, Brian Haley became the first ever Haringey Labour councillor to defect to the Liberal Democrats.

In November 2017, Haringey hit the headlines again with bitter recriminations following hard fought selection battles for candidacies for Labour seats at the 2018 Council election. In an unprecedented change, 23 of the 49 sitting Labour Councillors either retired, decided not to stand after losing a trigger ballot, or were deselected as candidates from their seats by Labour Party members.

The media highlighted a number of reasons for this change including a poisonous attitude in the local party, the influence of Momentum, the impact of the Haringey Development Vehicle, and the expressed will of the local members.

In May 2018 the Liberal Democrats increased their representation on the council from 8 to 15, controlling the wards of Crouch End, Highgate, Fortis Green, Alexandra, and Muswell Hill. Group leader Liz Morris was quoted as saying that Labour had failed to win the "hearts and minds of residents", but Labour retained the majority of seats on the council.

Seats on Haringey Council, by party:

(Boundary changes in 2002 reduced the number of councillors by 2)

Geography
See also List of districts in Haringey.

Physical geography
Haringey is a borough of contrasts geographically.

Haringey shares borders with six other London boroughs. Clockwise from the north, they are: Enfield, Waltham Forest, Hackney, Islington, Camden, and Barnet. Some of the more familiar local landmarks include Alexandra Palace, Bruce Castle and Tottenham Hotspur Football Club.

Haringey has  of parks, recreation grounds and open spaces which make up more than 25% of its total area. They include both smaller local areas and large green areas which provide an amenity for Londoners beyond the borough's boundaries. Local Nature Reserves and a number of conservation areas can also be found in the borough. The borough is also home to five distinct ancient woods. These are Highgate Woods, Queen's Wood, Coldfall Wood, Bluebell Wood and North Wood.

The borough has achieved Green Flag status for 25 of its parks, meaning they are judged to be welcoming, safe and well-managed, with active community involvement.

Amongst the larger open spaces are: Finsbury Park, Alexandra Park, Highgate Wood, Coldfall Wood and the Lee Valley Park.

There are three rivers of note still flowing above ground in the borough. These are:
River Moselle
The New River
River Lea

Demographics

According to the GLA's population projections for 2018, the current population of Haringey is 282,904 residents.

Haringey is the 6th most deprived borough in London, and the 30th most deprived local authority in England (out of 326). Within the borough there are extreme contrasts: neighbourhoods in some of the western wards, such as Highgate, Muswell Hill and Crouch End are among the most prosperous in the country; in the east of the borough, many neighbourhoods are classified as being among the most deprived in the country.

The population grew by 17.7% between the 2001 and 2011 Censuses, and is projected to have grown by a further 11% between 2011 and 2018.

The male to female ratio in Haringey is 50:50. While the age structure is similar to that of London, the borough has a slightly larger proportion of residents aged 20–44, and a slightly smaller proportion of residents aged 65+.

According to the GLA Population Estimate for 2018, 33.6% of the borough's population are White British, 25.9% are "Other White", 8.2% are of Black African heritage, and 5.8% are of Black Caribbean heritage. Haringey is also home to several smaller Asian communities.

44% of the population are Christian, 12% are Muslim and 3% Jewish. The Muslim population is centred in the middle of the borough around Harringay, while the Jewish community is largest on the western edges of the borough in Highgate, Crouch End and Muswell Hill (where members are predominately Orthodox, Reform and Liberal), and in the Seven Sisters ward in the east of the borough which is home to South Tottenham's largest Jewish community, who make up 18.1% of the population of the ward.

Ethnicity

Religion

Haringey is a religiously diverse borough, with large populations of all major world religions. 2021 census results were as follows:
Christianity - 39.3%
Islam - 12.6%
Judaism - 3.6%
Hinduism - 1.3%
Buddhism - 0.9%
Sikhism - 0.3%
Other Religions - 2.3% 
No religion - 31.6%
Not Stated - 8.0%

Public services

Housing

There are approximately 114,313 dwellings in Haringey. Of those: 43% are owner occupied; 29% are rented from the local authority or a housing association; and 24% are rented from a private landlord.

The local council and housing associations provide just over 27,000 affordable homes. As of Q4 2017 there were 3,002 households living in temporary accommodation in Haringey.

Education

Haringey has 64 primary (including infant and junior) schools, 11 secondary schools, a City Academy, 5 special schools and a pupil support centre. In addition, there are off site provision and study support centres for children and young people with additional needs.

The number of pupils in Haringey Schools as at January 2017 was 41,550 (including nursery age children). This total was made up as follows:
Primary (state-funded) 23,735 (pupils of compulsory school age).
Secondary (state-funded) 13,377 (including sixth form students).
Special School pupils and students 485 (including post 16 children).

In 2014 Haringey Council contacted OFSTED and the police after video footage emerged showing multiple incidents where primary age children at the Harris Primary Academy Coleraine Park, in Tottenham, were physically restrained or "dragged around", each by either two or three members of staff. An executive from the National Association of Head Teachers described it as "horrible" to see a "really distressed" child restrained in this way. The school's policy requires any use of restraint to be notified to the parents in writing, but this had not happened. The school issued a statement saying that physical restraint is only used when pupils present a risk to themselves or others, and that it can make it possible for them to continue in mainstream education rather than being permanently excluded.

Child welfare
The local authority is Haringey London Borough Council. Haringey Council has been the subject of nationwide criticism over its handling of the welfare of young children in connection with the murder of Victoria Climbié in 2000 and the death of Peter Connelly in 2007. In March 2009, Haringey Council's performance was placed by the Audit Commission in the bottom four of the country and the worst in London. In December 2009, Haringey's performance was placed by Ofsted in the bottom nine in the country for children's services. A later series of positive Ofsted inspections culminated in the service being taken out of 'special measures' by the government in February 2013.

Health & Social Care 
NHS services provide healthcare for all residents of Haringey. There are 52 General Practices across the borough as of 2022. These are grouped into eight Primary Care Networks with Haringey GP Federation covering the entire borough. In addition to Primary Care the population is cared for by several hospitals including the North Middlesex University Hospital, Homerton Hospital, Whittington Hospital and St Ann's Hospital. In addition, there are numerous Health & Social Care providers across the borough.

Economy

In 2016, there were 12,150 businesses in Haringey employing a total of 66,000 people. This accounted for 1.3% of all employment in London.

Haringey's economy is dominated by small businesses with 93.9% of businesses employing fewer than 10 people.

The main sectors of employment in Haringey are:

Wholesale and Retail tradeRetail and wholesale distribution – 18.2%
Health and social work - 19.0%
Real estate, renting and business activities - 15.3%
Education - 12.18%
Manufacturing - 8.3%
Public administration - 6.8%
Health and social work – 10.6%
Accommodation & Food Service activities -– 9.1%
Professional, Scientific & Technical activities - 7.6%
Administrative and Support Service activities - 6.8%
Transportation & Storage – 6.1%
Manufacturing – 4.5%
Public administration & Defence; Compulsory Social Security – 4.5%
Construction - 4.5% 
Manufacturing - 4.5%
Arts, Entertainment and Recreation – 4.5%
Information & Communication – 3.8%
Real estate activities - 3%
Financial & Insurance activities – 1.1%
Water supply, Sewerage, Waste management & Remediation activities – 0.6%
Other Service activities – 3%

Source

The principal shopping areas in the borough are Wood Green and Turnpike Lane, Muswell Hill, Crouch End, Harringay and Tottenham Hale.

Haringey is situated within the growth corridor connecting London with Stansted, Cambridge and Peterborough.

Culture

The borough has a number of facilities offering a wide range of cultural activity

Performing arts
Haringey's theatres include:
Haringey Shed - an outreach theatre group of Chicken Shed Theatre.
Jacksons Lane - a multi-arts centre with a full-time programme of theatre and participatory events.
New London Performing Arts Centre provides affordable, accessible drama, dance, singing and music classes to children of all ages
Bernie Grant Arts Centre.
Upstairs at the Gatehouse, Highgate
Downstairs at the King's Head
A wide range of small live music venues together with the bigger venues of Finsbury Park and Alexandra Palace.

Visual arts
Furtherfield
The Chocolate Factory

Sport

Tottenham Hotspur Football Club, currently in the FA Premier League, play at Tottenham Hotspur Stadium, which is located in the borough on Tottenham High Road. The borough also has two Non-League football clubs, Haringey Borough F.C. and Greenhouse London F.C., who both play at Coles Park.

London Skolars are a rugby league team that compete in Kingstone Press League 1. They play at New River Stadium in Wood Green, Haringey. The annual Middlesex 9s rugby league tournament also takes place at the New River Stadium.

The borough's ice hockey team, the Haringey Greyhounds, currently play at Alexandra Palace. Alexandra Palace has also hosted other events including the PDC World Darts Championship and a number of Boxing events.

During the 1970s, 80s and 90s, the Haringey Athletic Club were at the forefront of a new generation of inner city athletes producing many Olympians. They have since been amalgamated into the Enfield and Haringey Athletic Club. London Heathside, formed in 2000 following the merger of North London AC and Muswell Hill Runners, are also based at the London Marathon Athletics Track at Finsbury Park.

Transport
The 16 National Rail, London Overground and London Underground stations in the borough are:
Alexandra Palace (National Rail, ECML serviced by Great Northern services)
Bounds Green (London Underground, Piccadilly Line)
Bowes Park (National Rail, Hertford Branch, services by Great Northern services)
Bruce Grove (London Overground, Lea Valley Lines, Cheshunt Branch)
Harringay Green Lanes (London Overground, Gospel Oak - Barking Line)
Harringay (National Rail, ECML serviced by Great Northern services)
Highgate (London Underground, Northern Line)
Hornsey (National Rail, ECML serviced by Great Northern services)
Manor House (London Underground, Piccadilly Line)
Northumberland Park (National Rail, Lea Valley Main Line serviced by Greater Anglia services)
Seven Sisters (London Underground, Victoria Line and London Overground, Lea Valley Lines, Cheshunt Branch)
South Tottenham (London Overground, Gospel Oak - Barking Line)
Tottenham Hale (London Underground, Victoria Line and National Rail, Lea Valley Main Line serviced by Greater Anglia services)
Turnpike Lane (London Underground, Piccadilly Line)
White Hart Lane (London Overground, Lea Valley Lines, Cheshunt Branch)
Wood Green (London Underground, Piccadilly Line)

In March 2011, the main forms of transport that residents used to travel to work were: underground, metro, light rail, tram, 23.5% of all residents aged 16–74; driving a car or van, 11.3%; bus, minibus or coach, 11.3%; train, 4.7%; on foot, 4.1%; work mainly at or from home, 3.6%; bicycle, 3.2%.

Twin towns

Haringey has been twinned with Koblenz, Germany since 1969. It has also twinned with the towns of:
 Arima in Trinidad and Tobago,
 Clarendon in Jamaica,
 Holetown in St. James, Barbados,
 Larnaca in Cyprus,
 Livry-Gargan in the suburbs of Paris, France,
 Sundbyberg in Sweden and
 Jalasjarvi in Finland

Notable people

References and notes

External links
Key statistics on Haringey on London Councils website
Key leadership information on Haringey Council on the London Councils website
Harringay Online - independent website for Harringay Neighbourood, but used throughout the borough
Alexandra Palace
Alexandra Palace ice rink
Haringey London Borough Council - History
Haringey Freecycle group
Haringey Council Report, Knowing Our Children And Young People - Planning For Their Futures 
Haringey Rhinos RFC

 
1965 establishments in the United Kingdom
Haringey